The following is a list of past and present WNBA players considered to be "international" by the league. The list does not include players from the United States unless they have represented another country internationally during their playing careers. The WNBA considers all players from outside the 50 states and District of Columbia as "international", even if they are American citizens from US territories such as Puerto Rico and the United States Virgin Islands.

By country
Note: This list is correct through .

See also
 List of Women's National Basketball Association players
 List of foreign NBA players
 List of international WNBL players
 List of Australian WNBA players
 List of Serbian WNBA players

References

  
Foreign
     
Employment of foreign-born
Women's sport-related lists